No No No is a compilation of garage rock recordings from the 1960s issued by Arf! Arf! Records, and is available exclusively on compact disc.  In keeping with the sub-heading that reads "28 Moody, Somber and Tragic '60s Garage Rock Sagas", the set features mostly somber and downcast examples of the genre, many of them ballads in contrast to Arf! Arf!'s  subsequently released companion piece, Yeah Yeah Yeah, which instead features upbeat, driving, and hard-rocking songs.  There are no liner notes included, but the cover artwork nonetheless displays photographs of the labels of the original singles from which the tracks were taken.

The set commences with "She Haunts You" by the Syndicate who hailed from Long Beach, California.  The song was the B-side of "The Egyptian Thing".  "The Egyptian Thing", along with "My Baby's Barefoot", appears on the Back from the Grave series issued by Crypt Records.  This set is named for the next song, "No No No", which was recorded by Bermuda's the Savages live at the Hub, a nightclub at the Princess Hotel.  It appeared both as a single and on their 1966 live album Live 'n Wild.  Also featured is "Here to Stay" by Detroit's the Wanted.  "Hang around is by the Missing Lynx from Lawrenceburg, Tennessee.  The set's darkest cut is "Depression" by the Specters.  The Masters of Stonehouse do the folk-influenced "Please".  The somewhat meditative "My Heart Cries Out" by Action Unlimited features the inclusion of recurring sound effects along with an eastern-scaled woodwind solo.  The set closes with "You Hypnotize Me" by the Missing Links.

Track listing

The Syndicate: "She Haunts You"
The Savages: "No No No"   
The Wanted: "Here to Stay" 
The 5 P.M.: "How Many Days?" 
Something Else: "Let Me Say Now Love" 
The Bounty Hunters: "The Sun Went Away" 
The Missing Lynx: "Hang Around"
The Stonemen: "No More" 
The Specters: "Depression" 
The Landlords: "I'm Through with You"
The Satisfactions: "Never Be Happy"
The Counts: "Now You're Gone" 
Run-A-Rounds: "I Can't Take You Back" 
Masters Of Stonehouse: "Please" 
The Lost Souls: "Lost Love" 
The Bush: "Feeling Sad and Lonely" 
The Symmetry Of Sound: "Here Without You" 
The Invaders: "I Was a Fool" (Tyler Smith) 
The Paupers: "Searching for Someone" 
The Mad Hatters: "You May See Me Cry" 
The Psychopaths: "See the Girl" 
The In Mates: "The Same"
The Eye Zooms: "She's Gone"
The Bad Manners: "I Am Alone" 
The Monuments: "You'll Find the Way"
The Action Unlimited: "My Heart Cries Out" 
The Ascots: "Where I'm Goin'" 
The Missing Links: "You Hypnotize Me"

Catalogue and release information

Compact disc (Arf! Arf! AACC-076 )

References

1998 compilation albums
Arf! Arf! Records compilation albums
Garage rock compilation albums